is a retired Japanese judoka and mixed martial artist from Nihon University. He won a gold medal at the Half Middleweight category of the 2000 Summer Olympics.



Judo career
Takimoto was relatively unknown entering the 2000 Summer Olympics in Sydney, Australia with his biggest victory before 2000 coming in the 1995 Asian Games. He recorded a Sode tsurikomi goshi and two Yukos in the gold medal match vs. In-Chul Cho. Throughout his career, Takimoto defeated many notable judoka, including Olympic medalists Djamel Bouras, Bertrand Damaisin and Flávio Canto.

Mixed martial arts career
Takimoto began to consider a career in MMA after attending Pride 28 on Oct. 31, 2004 and seeing his friends and fellow judoka have success in the sport. He announced on Dec. 7, 2004 that he would make his debut at Pride Shockwave 2004 against any fighter at any weight, as long as it was a "non-judo fighter." He got his wish and made his debut vs. former Sumo Maegashira Henry Miller, winning via unanimous decision. He outlanded Miller almost 2-to-1 in significant strikes and took him down twice despite being significantly outweighed. He fought for Pride six times in his career, posting a 3-3 record with the organization. His victories came against the aforementioned Miller, fellow judoka Dong-Sik Yoon and Taekwondo expert Zelg Galešić.

After Pride was disbanded in 2007, Takimoto earned the biggest victory of his MMA career, a split decision win over former UFC Middleweight Champion Murilo Bustamante at Yarennoka on Dec. 31, 2007. He then joined the Sengoku Raiden Championship and fought four times with the organization. Takimoto was expected to participate in ASTRA, the farewell event for Hidehiko Yoshida on April 25, 2010. However, he pulled out of the event and announced his retirement alongside Yoshida.

Mixed martial arts record

|-
| Win
| align=center| 6–5
| Jae Sun Lee
| Decision (unanimous)
| World Victory Road Presents: Sengoku 10
| 
| align=center| 3
| align=center| 5:00
| Saitama, Japan
| 
|-
| Win
| align=center| 5–5
| Michael Costa
| Submission (heel hook)
| World Victory Road Presents: Sengoku 8
| 
| align=center| 1
| align=center| 3:31
| Tokyo, Japan
| Welterweight debut
|-
| Loss
| align=center| 4–5
| Frank Trigg
| Decision (unanimous)
| World Victory Road Presents: Sengoku 4
| 
| align=center| 3
| align=center| 5:00
| Saitama, Japan
| 
|-
| Loss
| align=center| 4–4
| Evangelista Santos
| Submission (achilles lock)
| World Victory Road Presents: Sengoku First Battle
| 
| align=center| 1
| align=center| 4:51
| Tokyo, Japan
| 
|-
| Win
| align=center| 4–3
| Murilo Bustamante
| Decision (split)
| Yarennoka!
| 
| align=center| 2
| align=center| 5:00
| Saitama, Japan
| 
|-
| Win
| align=center| 3–3
| Zelg Galešic
| Submission (kimura)
| Pride 34
| 
| align=center| 1
| align=center| 5:40
| Saitama, Japan
| 
|-
| Loss
| align=center| 2–3
| Gegard Mousasi
| TKO (broken eye socket)
| Pride - Bushido 11
| 
| align=center| 1
| align=center| 5:34
| Saitama, Japan
| 
|-
| Loss
| align=center| 2–2
| Sanae Kikuta
| Decision (unanimous)
| Pride Shockwave 2005
| 
| align=center| 3
| align=center| 5:00
| Saitama, Japan
| 
|-
| Win
| align=center| 2–1
| Dong-Sik Yoon
| Decision (unanimous)
| Pride 30
| 
| align=center| 3
| align=center| 5:00
| Saitama, Japan
| 
|-
| Loss
| align=center| 1–1
| Kiyoshi Tamura
| Decision (unanimous)
| Pride Critical Countdown 2005
| 
| align=center| 3
| align=center| 5:00
| Saitama, Japan
| 
|-
| Win
| align=center| 1–0
| Henry Miller
| Decision (unanimous)
| Pride Shockwave 2004
| 
| align=center| 3
| align=center| 5:00
| Saitama, Japan
|

References

External links
 
 
 Takimoto's biography on PrideFC.com

1974 births
Living people
Japanese male judoka
Japanese male mixed martial artists
Welterweight mixed martial artists
Mixed martial artists utilizing judo
People from Ibaraki Prefecture
Judoka at the 2000 Summer Olympics
Olympic judoka of Japan
Nihon University alumni
Olympic medalists in judo
Medalists at the 2000 Summer Olympics
Olympic gold medalists for Japan